Mitchelltown Historic District is a national historic district located at Kinston, Lenoir County, North Carolina. It encompasses 204 contributing buildings in a predominantly residential section of Kinston. The buildings include notable examples of Colonial Revival, Classical Revival, and Bungalow / American Craftsman style architecture and date between 1885 and 1941. Notable buildings include the Adolphus Mitchell House (c. 1885), W. A. Mitchell House (c. 1905), Luther P. Tapp House (c. 1916), H. B. W. Canady House, and Robert B. Scott Bouse.

It was listed on the National Register of Historic Places in 1989.

References

Historic districts on the National Register of Historic Places in North Carolina
Colonial Revival architecture in North Carolina
Neoclassical architecture in North Carolina
Buildings and structures in Lenoir County, North Carolina
National Register of Historic Places in Lenoir County, North Carolina